Microniinae is a subfamily of the lepidopteran family Uraniidae.

Genera
Acropteris Geyer in Hübner, 1832
Aploschema Warren, 1897
Dissoprumna Warren, 1897
Micronia Guenée, 1857
Pseudomicronia Moore, [1887]
Stesichora Meyrick, 1886
Strophidia Hübner, [1823]

References

Uraniidae